Scania anelluspinata is a moth of the family Noctuidae. It is found in the Maule Region of Chile and Río Negro and El Mayoco in Argentina.

The wingspan is about 23 mm. Adults are on wing from in February.

External links
 Noctuinae of Chile

Noctuinae